Andrew Haley (born 16 January 1974) is a retired Canadian Paralympic swimmer who competed in international level events. He was a three-time World champion, five-time Paralympic medalist and a Commonwealth champion.

At six years old, Haley broke his leg while playing with his brother. He was also diagnosed with cancer in his right leg and it was amputated above the knee. The cancer returned two years later which spread into his lung, in both cases, Haley was given a 35% chance of survival.

References

External links
 
 

1974 births
Living people
Sportspeople from Halifax, Nova Scotia
Sportspeople from Moncton
Paralympic swimmers of Canada
Swimmers at the 1992 Summer Paralympics
Swimmers at the 1996 Summer Paralympics
Swimmers at the 2000 Summer Paralympics
Swimmers at the 2004 Summer Paralympics
Swimmers at the 1994 Commonwealth Games
Medalists at the 1992 Summer Paralympics
Medalists at the 1996 Summer Paralympics
Medalists at the 2000 Summer Paralympics
Canadian amputees
Paralympic medalists in swimming
Paralympic gold medalists for Canada
Paralympic bronze medalists for Canada
Commonwealth Games gold medallists for Canada
Canadian male freestyle swimmers
Canadian male butterfly swimmers
Canadian male medley swimmers
Canadian male backstroke swimmers
S9-classified Paralympic swimmers
Commonwealth Games medallists in swimming
Medallists at the 1994 Commonwealth Games